The Roman Catholic Diocese of Irecê is a diocese located in the city of Irecê in the Ecclesiastical province of Feira de Santana in Brazil.

History
 April 28, 1979: Established as Diocese of Irecê from the Diocese of Barra and the Diocese of Ruy Barbosa

Leadership
 Bishops of Irecê (Roman rite), in reverse chronological order
 Bishop Tommaso Cascianelli, C.P. (2000.07.05 – present)
 Bishop João Maria Messi, O.S.M. (1995.03.22 – 1999.11.17), appointed Bishop of Barra do Piraí-Volta Redonda, Rio de Janeiro
 Bishop Edgar Carício de Gouvêa (1983.06.13 – 1994.03.02)
 Bishop Homero Leite Meira (1980.09.24 – 1983.06.13)

References
 GCatholic.org
 Catholic Hierarchy
 Diocese website (Portuguese) 

Roman Catholic dioceses in Brazil
Christian organizations established in 1979
Irecê, Roman Catholic Diocese of
Roman Catholic dioceses and prelatures established in the 20th century